Greg Thomson is an Australian journalist.

Greg Thomson may also refer to:

Greg Thomson (ice hockey)

See also
Greg Thompson (disambiguation)